The Boys' Doubles tournament of the 2014 Asian Junior Badminton Championships was held from February 19–23 in Taipei, Taiwan. The defending champion of the last edition were the Chinese pair Li Junhui and Liu Yuchen. Last year finalist Huang Kaixiang / Zheng Siwei who standing in the first seeded this year, emerge as the champion after beat the South Korean pair the second seeded Kim Jae-hwan / Kim Jung-ho in the finals with the score 21–16, 21–14. Japanese pairs Kenya Mitsuhashi / Yuta Watanabe and Hashiru Shimono / Kanta Tsuneyama finished in the semi-finals round, settle for the bronze medal.

Seeded

  Huang Kaixiang / Zheng Siwei (champion)
  Kim Jae-hwan / Kim Jung-ho (final)
  Choi Jong-woo / Seo Seung-jae (third round)
  Ketlen Kittinupong / Dechapol Puavaranukroh (third round)
  Yonny Chung / Yeung Shing Choi (third round)
  Chua Khek Wei / Ng Di Hua (third round)
  Ngiam Bin / Tan Ming Shun (second round)
  Do Tuan Duc / Pham Cao Cuong (third round)

Draw

Finals

Top Half

Section 1

Section 2

Section 3

Section 4

Bottom Half

Section 5

Section 6

Section 7

Section 8

References

External links 
Main Draw

2014 Asian Junior Badminton Championships